is an island in the Gotō Islands, Japanese islands in the East China Sea, off the western coast of Kyūshū. The islands are a part of Nagasaki Prefecture in Japan.

History
Evidence of human settlement in the on Nakadōri Island trace back to the Jōmon period. In the Heian period, the island were used as port of calls during Japanese missions to Tang China.

In August 2004, the towns of Kamigotō, Shin-Uonome, Arikawa, Narao, Wakamatsu merged into a new town named Shin-Kamigotō.

In 2017, the island enjoyed a minor boost in tourism after Japanese idol Neru Nagahama, who grew up in Narao, released a photobook which features parts of the island.

References

Islands of Nagasaki Prefecture